The Church of St Mary stands in the centre of the village of Magor, Monmouthshire, Wales. It was designated a Grade I listed building in 1963. The church is the lead church of the Magor Rectorial Benefice, led by Rev. Jeremy Harris, and administers to a population of around 12,000.

History and architecture
It is possible that the church was originally dedicated to Cadwaladr, the last Welsh ruler to call himself King of Britain, who died of the plague in 664 AD.

John Newman, in his 2000 Gwent/Monmouthshire volume of the Pevsner Buildings of Wales series, describes St Mary's as "one of the most ambitious churches in the county, though the ambitions were not all realised." It is in the Decorated style with a prominent, integral, tower. The church was originally dedicated to St Leonard, until the mid-nineteenth century restoration. The porch, of the fourteenth/fifteenth centuries, has buttresses which display "ferocious gargoyles and pinnacles."

The interior contains interesting, nineteenth-century, stained glass, including The Good Shepherd by Kempe & Co of 1930–31. The churchyard is the burial place of Welsh composer Mansel Thomas (1909–1986).

Next to the church stands The Procurator's House, a sixteenth-century house, now ruined, which belonged to the vicarage of Magor.

References

Sources
 

Grade I listed churches in Monmouthshire
Church in Wales church buildings